Wapaskokimaw 202 is an Indian reserve of the Peter Ballantyne Cree Nation in Saskatchewan. It is 90 kilometers north of Creighton.

References

Indian reserves in Saskatchewan
Peter Ballantyne Cree Nation